Mary C. Whitman (1809–1875) was an American educator who served as the second president (referred to at that time as "principal") of Mount Holyoke College (then Mount Holyoke Female Seminary)  from 1849 to 1850.  She graduated from Mount Holyoke in 1839, taught there from 1840 to 1842, and was Associate Principal from 1842 to 1849 before becoming Head.

See also
Presidents of Mount Holyoke College

References

External links
Biography

Mount Holyoke College alumni
Mount Holyoke College faculty
Presidents and Principals of Mount Holyoke College
1809 births
1875 deaths